Emilio Munda (born 14 January 1982 in Fermo) is an Italian songwriter, arranger, composer and producer. 
Conquer the podium of the 69th Sanremo Festival as an author and composer of the song "Musica che resta" for the international group Il Volo
and ranks second at the 70th Sanremo Festival as author and composer of the song "8 Marzo" interpreted by Tecla Insolia also winning the critics' award.

He composed songs for Eros Ramazzotti, Umberto Tozzi, Francesco Renga, Nina Zilli, Gemelli Diversi, Nomadi, Sergio Dalma, Tecla Insolia, Il Volo, Dear Jack, Michele Bravi, Valerio Scanu, Silvia Mezzanotte, and for other artists of Italian television talent: The Voice of Italy, Amici di Maria De Filippi and X Factor

Life and career 

Emilio Munda was born in Fermo, central Italy, in 1982. His family introduced him to music at the age of four, when he started learning to play the drums.
His compositions have been interpreted by various artists on the Italian and international scene, winning gold and platinum records both in Italy and around the world. For two consecutive times he won the podium at the Sanremo Festival as an author and composer.

In 2008 he wrote for Umberto Tozzi the single "Cerco ancora te", which was included in the album Non solo live. The song was later re-released in France, Belgium and Switzerland as part of Yesterday, the singer's international greatest hits collection.

In 2010 Emilio Munda won an international songwriting competition held by singer Francesco Renga. After his victory, he was offered a 3-year exclusive contract to work with Renga himself. 
Munda's original songs were released as part of Renga's Un giorno bellissimo album. The song was awarded a golden record at the 2011 Wind Music Awards. One of Emilio's songs, "Di sogni e illusioni", was also included in Fermoimmagine Deluxe, Renga's first hits collection, released after the singer's participation in the 62nd Sanremo edition.

Since 2013, Munda collaborates with the Italian record label Sugar Music. 
In 2014 Emilio Munda's song "Puoi scegliere" was chosen by The Voice of Italy finalist and Sanremo participant Veronica De Simone  to be included in her album Ti presento Maverick. Shortly afterwards, a new album/collection by Francesco Renga, named The Platinum Collection was released, featuring two songs composed by Munda himself.

On 10 June 2014 Emilio Munda publishes his song "Un mondo più vero" as the fourth track of the new album A passi piccoli by Michele Bravi, winner of the seventh edition of X-Factor Italy.

On 12 February 2015 the new album of Dear Jack, Domani è un altro film (seconda parte) is released, containing the song "Le strade del mio tempo" written by Emilio Munda. The album was certified platinum on 29 May 2015 by FIMI.

On 30 September 2016 he was the author and composer of the song "La Fiamma", which is included in the Gemelli Diversi’s album Uppercat, released on 21 October. Munda also writes the fifth track of that album, "Un soffio dal traguardo".

Later he becomes author and composer for Nina Zilli, composing the song "Per un niente" published in the album Modern art. According to the website "All Music", the song is the best album's track.

In October he collaborated with Nomadi for the realization of the album Nomadi dentro. He also wrote, along with Beppe Carletti, the song "Può succedere", of which Munda is author and composer.
He also reconfirms the collaboration with Michele Bravi, writing the song entitled "Il sole contro", which is inserted in the album Anime di carta - Nuove Pagine and the song written for Nina Zilli is republished in the new album Modern Art Sanremo Edition, released in conjunction with the Sanremo Festival.
In 2018 he wrote the summer single for the singer Valerio Scanu entitled: "Capovolgo il mondo" and is composer of the song "L'ultimo spettacolo", both unpublished contained in the new album released 5 October 2018 entitled DIECI.

More recent collaborations 

In 2019 he brings the song "Musica che resta" interpreted by Il Volo to the Sanremo Festival, while the following year he brings the song |8 marzo| interpreted by Tecla Insolia to the Sanremo Festival, conquering the podium with both songs.

The following year he collaborates with Eros Ramazzotti on the writing of the song "El Paraíso Junto a Mí" for the international artist Sergio Dalma winning the gold record in Spain and in the same period Munda is chosen as a juror to select the artists who will take the prestigious stage of the Eurovision Song Contest

In 2022 he works on Eros Ramazzotti's album composing 3 songs: "Ti dedico", "Nessuno a parte noi" and '"Gli Ultimi romantici". The latter is selected as a single from the album and reaches the top positions in the charts.

Discography

Major songs 

The collaborations are listed in parentheses in the title section.

References

External links 

 

1982 births
Living people
People from Fermo
Italian songwriters
Male songwriters